Two of the Natives of New Holland, Advancing to Combat is a drawing by Sydney Parkinson, drawn in 1770 and published posthumously as an etching by Thomas Chambers in the 1773 book A Journal of a Voyage to the South Seas. It is the earliest known portrayal of an Australian Aborigine by a European, and a typical example of a painting in the noble savage ideal, showing proud warriors advancing in defence of their land. The stance of the warriors is said to be based upon the Borghese Gladiator.

References 

1773 drawings
Australian art